Janno Botman (born 8 March 2000) in Andijk, Netherlands is a Dutch long track speed skater.

Personal records

Tournament overview

source:

References

Living people
2000 births
People from Andijk